Rodney Sturt Taylor (11 January 1930 – 7 January 2015) was an Australian actor. He appeared in more than 50 feature films, including The Time Machine (1960), The Birds (1963), and Inglourious Basterds (2009), and voiced a lead role in One Hundred and One Dalmatians (1961).

Taylor was born in Lidcombe, a suburb of Sydney, to a father who was a steel construction contractor and commercial artist and a mother who was a children's author. He began taking art classes in high school, and continued in college. He decided to become an actor after seeing Laurence Olivier in an Old Vic touring production of Richard III.

His first film role was in a re-enactment of Charles Sturt's voyage down the Murrumbidgee and Murray Rivers, playing Sturt's offsider, George Macleay. At the time, he was also appearing in a number of theatre productions for Australia's Mercury Theatre. He made his feature film debut in the Australian Lee Robinson film King of the Coral Sea (1954). He soon started acting in television films, such as Studio 57 (1954), where he played multiple different characters.

He started to gain popularity after starring in The Time Machine (1960), as H. George Wells. He later starred in the Disney film One Hundred and One Dalmatians (1961), as Pongo. In one of his most famous roles, he played Mitch Brenner in The Birds, directed by Alfred Hitchcock (1963). By the late 1990s, Taylor had moved into semi-retirement. His final film role was in Quentin Tarantino's Inglourious Basterds in 2009, portraying a fictionalized version of Winston Churchill in a cameo.

Early life
Taylor was born on 11 January 1930 in Lidcombe, a suburb of Sydney, the only child of William Sturt Taylor, a steel construction contractor and commercial artist, and Mona Taylor (née Thompson), a writer of more than a hundred short stories and children's books. His middle name comes from his great-great-granduncle, Captain Charles Sturt, a British explorer of the Australian outback in the 19th century.

Taylor attended Parramatta High School and later studied at the East Sydney Technical and Fine Arts College and took art classes. His mother wanted him to be an artist, and pressured him into taking the art classes. For a time he worked as a commercial artist, but he decided to become an actor after seeing Laurence Olivier in an Old Vic touring production of Richard III.

Career

Australia
Taylor acquired extensive radio and stage experience in Australia, where his radio work included a period on Blue Hills and a role as Tarzan. Earlier in his career he had to support himself by working at Sydney's Mark Foy's department store, designing and painting window and other displays during the day. In 1951, he took part in a re-enactment of Charles Sturt's voyage down the Murrumbidgee and Murray Rivers, playing Sturt's offsider, George Macleay. A short documentary, Inland with Sturt (1951), was based on it. Taylor also appeared in a number of theatre productions for Australia's Mercury Theatre.

Taylor made his feature film debut in the Australian Lee Robinson film King of the Coral Sea (1954), playing an American. He later played Israel Hands in a Hollywood-financed film shot in Sydney, Long John Silver (1954), an unofficial sequel to Treasure Island. Following these two films, Taylor was awarded the 1954 Rola Show Australian Radio Actor of the Year Award, which included a ticket to London via Los Angeles, but Taylor did not continue on to London.

Hollywood

Taylor soon landed roles in television shows such as Studio 57 and the films Hell on Frisco Bay (1955) and Giant (1956). In 1955, he guest-starred as Clancy in the third episode ("The Argonauts") of the first hour-long Western television series, Cheyenne, an ABC program starring Clint Walker. Taylor and Edward Andrews played gold seekers Clancy and Duncan, respectively, who are best friends until they strike it rich, only to see Native Americans release their gold dust to the wind. The episode was a remake of the film The Treasure of the Sierra Madre (1948). Taylor was considered for one of the leads in Warner Bros. Television's Maverick.

Toward the end of 1955, Taylor unsuccessfully screen tested to play boxer Rocky Graziano in Metro-Goldwyn-Mayer's Somebody Up There Likes Me after James Dean's death, but his use of a Brooklyn accent and physical prowess in the test impressed the studio enough to give him a long-term contract. At MGM, he played a series of support roles in The Catered Affair (1956), Raintree County (1957), and Ask Any Girl (1959). He had a significant role in Separate Tables (1958), which won Oscars for two of its stars, David Niven and Wendy Hiller. He also made a strong impression guest-starring in an episode of The Twilight Zone titled "And When the Sky Was Opened" (1959).

Stardom
Taylor's first leading role in a feature film was in The Time Machine (1960), George Pal's adaptation of the science-fiction classic by H. G. Wells, with Taylor as the time traveller who, thousands of years in the future, falls for a woman played by Yvette Mimieux. Taylor played a character not unlike that of his Twilight Zone episode of a year earlier and the film World Without End in 1956.

In or around 1960, he was approached regarding the role of James Bond in the first feature-length Bond film. Taylor reportedly declined to become involved because he considered the character of Bond "beneath him". Taylor later commented: "Every time a new Bond picture became a smash hit ... I tore out my hair."

In the 1960–1961 television season, Taylor starred as foreign correspondent Glenn Evans in the ABC dramatic series Hong Kong. His principal co-star was Lloyd Bochner; Jack Kruschen played the bartender, Tully. The program faced stiff competition on Wednesday evenings from NBC's Wagon Train, hence lasted for only one season. He voiced Pongo (a Dalmatian dog) in Disney's animated feature One Hundred and One Dalmatians (1961) and also guest-starred on Marilyn Maxwell's short-lived ABC series Bus Stop around the same time. In 1962, he starred in an episode of NBC's The DuPont Show of the Week ("The Ordeal of Dr. Shannon"), an adaptation of A. J. Cronin's novel Shannon's Way.

Taylor starred in Alfred Hitchcock's horror thriller The Birds (1963), along with Tippi Hedren, Suzanne Pleshette, Jessica Tandy and Veronica Cartwright, playing a man whose town and home come under attack by menacing birds. Taylor then starred with Jane Fonda in the romantic comedy Sunday in New York (also 1963).

During the mid-1960s, Taylor worked mostly for MGM. His credits including The V.I.P.s (1963), his first feature film role as an Australian, with Richard Burton, Elizabeth Taylor, and Maggie Smith; Fate Is the Hunter (for 20th Century Fox, 1964) with Glenn Ford and Suzanne Pleshette; 36 Hours (1964) with James Garner; Young Cassidy (1965) with Julie Christie and Maggie Smith; The Liquidator (1965) with Jill St. John; Do Not Disturb (1965); and The Glass Bottom Boat (1966), both co-starring Doris Day.

He began to change his image toward the end of the decade to more tough-guy roles, such as Chuka (1967), which he also produced, and he starred in Hotel (1967) with Catherine Spaak; Dark of the Sun (or The Mercenaries, 1968), again with Yvette Mimieux; Nobody Runs Forever (1968) where he played New South Wales Police Sergeant Scobie Malone, this being Taylor's first starring feature film role as an Australian; and Darker than Amber (1970) as Travis McGee.

He was also reportedly up for the role of martial artist Roper in the Bruce Lee vehicle Enter the Dragon (1973). The film was directed by Robert Clouse, who had also directed Taylor in the film Darker than Amber (1970). Taylor was supposedly deemed too tall for the part, and the role instead went to John Saxon.

Later career
In 1973, Taylor was cast in The Train Robbers alongside long time friend John Wayne and Ann-Margret. The film was a box office success. Taylor also had some television roles: he starred in Bearcats! (1971) on CBS and in The Oregon Trail (1976) on NBC. He had a regular role in the short-lived spy drama series Masquerade (1983) and played one of the leads in the equally short-lived series, Outlaws (1986). From 1988 to 1990, Taylor appeared in the CBS drama series Falcon Crest as Frank Agretti, playing opposite Jane Wyman. In the mid-1990s, he appeared in several episodes of Murder, She Wrote and Walker, Texas Ranger.

In 1993, he hosted the documentary Time Machine: The Journey Back. The special ended with a mini-sequel written by David Duncan, the screenwriter of the George Pal film. Taylor recreated his role as George, reuniting him with Filby (Alan Young).

Taylor returned to Australia several times over the years to make films, playing a 1920s traveling showman in The Picture Show Man (1977) and a paid killer in On the Run (1983). In the black comedy Welcome to Woop Woop (1997), he played the foul-mouthed redneck Daddy-O.

By the late 1990s, Taylor had moved into semi-retirement. In 2007, he appeared in the horror telemovie Kaw, which revisits the idea of marauding birds turning on their human tormentors. In this film, however, the cause of the disturbance was discovered by Taylor who plays the town doctor. He appeared in Quentin Tarantino's Inglourious Basterds in 2009, portraying Winston Churchill in a cameo. In 2017, a documentary on Taylor's life, "Pulling No Punches", was released and entered into the Beverly Hills Film Festival.

Personal life
His first wife was model Peggy Williams (1951–1954). They divorced after allegations of domestic violence. Taylor later claimed that they divorced because they felt they were too young to have a healthy marriage. Taylor dated and was briefly engaged to Swedish actress Anita Ekberg in the early 1960s. He dated model Pat Sheehan in the late 1960s.

His second marriage was to model Mary Hilem (1963–1969). The couple had one daughter, now-retired CNN financial reporter Felicia Taylor (born 1964). Taylor bought a home in Palm Springs, California in 1967.

He married his third wife, Carol Kikumura, in 1980. They had originally dated in the early 1960s when she was an extra on his TV series Hong Kong. The couple got back together in 1971 and dated for an additional nine years before marrying.

Death
Taylor died of a heart attack at his home, surrounded by his family, on 7 January 2015, in Beverly Hills, California, four days before his 85th birthday. He was survived by his wife, Carol, and his daughter Felicia.

Filmography

Feature films

 King of the Coral Sea (1954) as Jack Janiero (film debut)
 Long John Silver (1954) as Israel Hands
 The Virgin Queen (1955) as Cpl. Gwilym (uncredited)
 Top Gun (1955) as Lem Sutter
 Hell on Frisco Bay (1956) as John Brodie Evans
 World Without End (1956) as Herbert Ellis
 The Catered Affair (1956) as Ralph Halloran
 Giant (1956) as Sir David Karfrey
 The Rack (1956) as Al (uncredited)
 Raintree County (1957) as Garwood B. Jones
 Step Down to Terror (1958) as Mike Randall
 Separate Tables (1958) as Charles
 Ask Any Girl (1959) as Ross Tayford
 The Time Machine (1960) as H. George Wells
 Colossus and the Amazon Queen (1960) as Pirro
 One Hundred and One Dalmatians (1961) as Narrator Pongo (voice)
 Seven Seas to Calais (1962) as Sir Francis Drake
 The Birds (1963) as Mitch Brenner
 The V.I.P.s (1963) as Les Mangrum
 A Gathering of Eagles (1963) as Col. Hollis Farr
 Sunday in New York (1963) as Mike Mitchell
 Fate Is the Hunter (1964) as Capt. Jack Savage
 36 Hours (1965) as Maj. Walter Gerber
 Young Cassidy (1965) as John Cassidy
 The Liquidator (1965) as Boysie Oakes
 Do Not Disturb (1965) as Mike Harper
 The Glass Bottom Boat (1966) as Bruce Templeton
 Hotel (1967) as Peter McDermott
 Chuka (1967) as Chuka
 Dark of the Sun (1968) as Capt. Bruce Curry
 Nobody Runs Forever (1968) (a.k.a. The High Commissioner) as Scobie Malone
 The Hell with Heroes (1968) as Brynie MacKay
 Zabriskie Point (1970) as Lee Allen
 Darker than Amber (1970) as Travis McGee
 The Man Who Had Power Over Women (1970) as Peter Reaney
 Powderkeg (1971, TV movie/pilot for Bearcats!) as Hank Brackett
 Family Flight (1972, TV movie) as Jason Carlyle
 The Train Robbers  (1973) as Grady
 Gli eroi (1973) (a.k.a. The Heroes) as Lieutenant Bob Robson
 Trader Horn (1973) as Trader Horn
 The Deadly Trackers (1973) as Frank Brand
 Hell River (1974) (a.k.a. Partizani) as Marko
 A Matter of Wife... and Death (1975, TV movie) as Shamus McCoy
 Blondie (1976) as Christopher Tauling
 The Oregon Trail (1976, series) as Evan Thorpe
 Gulliver's Travels (1977) as Reldresal / King of Blefuscu (voice, uncredited)
 The Picture Show Man (1977) as Palmer
 The Treasure Seekers (1979) as Marian Casey
 Cry of the Innocent (1980, TV movie) as Steve Donegin
 Jacqueline Bouvier Kennedy (1981, TV movie) as 'Black Jack' Bouvier
 Charles & Diana: A Royal Love Story (1982, TV movie) as Edward Adeane
 A Time to Die (1982) as Jack Bailey
 On the Run (1983) as Mr. Payatta
 Terror in the Aisles (1984) as Himself (stock footage)
 Marbella, un golpe de cinco estrellas (1985) as Commander
 Half Nelson (1985, TV series)
 Mask of Murder (1985) as Supt. Bob McLaine
 Danielle Steel's 'Palomino' (1991, TV movie) as Bill King
 Grass Roots (1992, TV movie) as Gen. Willoughby
 Open Season (1995) – Billy Patrick
 Point of Betrayal (1995) as Ted Kitteridge
 Welcome to Woop Woop  (1998) as Daddy-O
 The Warlord: Battle for the Galaxy (1998, TV movie) as General Sorenson
 Kaw (2007, TV movie) as Doc
 Inglourious Basterds (2009) as Winston Churchill (final film role)

Documentaries
 Inland with Sturt (1951) as George Mcleady
 The Fantasy Film Worlds of George Pal (1985)
 Time Machine: The Journey Back (1993)
 All About the Birds (2000) 
 Not Quite Hollywood (2008)
Pulling No Punches (2016)

Television

As a regular
Taylor had several lead roles in television, from the early 1960s to the early first decade of the 21st century. Among his television shows as a regular are:
 Hong Kong with co-star Lloyd Bochner (1960, ABC)
 Bearcats! (1971, CBS)
 The Oregon Trail as Evan Thorpe, a widower taking his three children from their Illinois farm to the Pacific Northwest by way of the Oregon Trail (1977, NBC)
 Masquerade (1983)
 Outlaws (1986)

Guest appearances
 Studio 57 (1955) – "The Last Day on Earth", "The Black Sheep's Daughter"
 Lux Video Theatre (1955) – "Dark Tribute", "The Browning Version"
 Cheyenne (1955) – "The Argonauts"
 Suspicion (1957) – "The Story of Marjorie Reardon"
 Schlitz Playhouse of Stars (1958) – "A Thing to Fight For"
 Studio One (1958) – "Image of Fear"
 Lux Playhouse (1958) – "The Best House in the Valley"
 Playhouse 90 (1958–59) – "Verdict of Three", "The Long March", The Great Gatsby, "The Raider", "Misalliance"
 The Twilight Zone (1959) – "And When the Sky Was Opened"
 Dick Powell's Zane Grey Theatre (1960) – "Picture of Sal"
 Goodyear Theatre (1960) – "Capital Gains"
 General Electric Theater (1960) – "Early to Die", "The Young Years"
 Westinghouse Desilu Playhouse (1960) – "Thunder in the Night"
 Bus Stop (1961) – "Portrait of a Hero"
 The DuPont Show of the Week (1962) – "The Ordeal of Dr. Shannon"
 Tales of the Unexpected (TV series) (1980) – "The Hitch-Hiker"
 Falcon Crest (1988–1990) as Frank Agretti
 Murder, She Wrote (1995)
 Walker, Texas Ranger (1996-1997, 2000) – "Redemption", "Texas vs. Cahill", "Wedding Bells"

Theatre credits
 Julius Caesar by William Shakespeare (Independent, 1950)
 Home of the Brave by Arthur Laurents (Independent, 1950)
 Misalliance by George Bernard Shaw (John Alden Company, 1951)
 Twins by Plautus (Mercury, 1952)
 The Comedy of Errors by William Shakespeare (Mercury, 1952)
 The Witch by John Masefield (Mercury, 1952)
 They Knew What They Wanted by Sidney Howard (Mercury, 1952)
 The Happy Time by Samuel A. Taylor (Mercury, 1953)

References

External links
 Rod Taylor official site
 
 
 
 
 Rod Taylor Australian theatre credits at AusStage
 
 Rod Taylor at National Film and Sound Archive
 Rod Taylor at Aveleyman.com

1930 births
2015 deaths
20th-century Australian male actors
21st-century Australian male actors
Australian expatriate male actors in the United States
Australian male film actors
Australian people of English descent
Australian male radio actors
Australian male television actors
Outstanding Performance by a Cast in a Motion Picture Screen Actors Guild Award winners
Male actors from Sydney
Male actors from Palm Springs, California
Metro-Goldwyn-Mayer contract players
Burials at Forest Lawn Memorial Park (Hollywood Hills)
Family of Charles Sturt
People educated at Parramatta High School